Tamás Szabó (born 30 October 1956) is a controversial and former Hungarian prelate of the Roman Catholic Church.

Biography

Born in Zirc, he was ordained a priest on 20 August 1988.

On 28 November 2001 he was appointed the leading Catholic chaplain in the Hungarian military by Pope John Paul II. Szabó received his episcopal consecration on 12 January 2002 from László Cardinal Paskai, with Archbishop István Seregély and Bishop Lajos Pápai serving as co-consecrators.

He resigned as Bishop for the Catholic Military Ordinariate of Hungary on 15 March 2007 in order to pursue marriage with a woman he met in the Church's charismatic movement. Other sources report this woman works in the Ministry of Defence. Szabó told Népszabadság that, "I do not want to talk about my private life. I don't think that is a public matter."

References

External links
Catholic-Hierarchy profile

1956 births
Living people
People from Veszprém County
21st-century Roman Catholic bishops in Hungary
Laicized Roman Catholic bishops